WZYK (94.7 FM) is a radio station with an adult contemporary format. Licensed to Clinton, Kentucky, United States, the station serves the Purchase area of Western Kentucky.  The station is currently owned by Bristol Broadcasting Company, Inc.

History
The station went on the air in 1955 as WXID. Its call letters were changed to WBLN on 1997-03-17. On 1998-03-17, the station changed its call sign to WIVR-FM, on 1999-09-24 to WIVR, on 2000-06-30 to WLLE, on 2004-06-14 to WQQR, and on 2014-04-10 to the current WZYK.

 On September 15, 2008, The Double Q re-launched their on-air product, adding a wider selection of music and a new logo.  They also acquired the highly sought-after Brian James to be the voice of the station's imaging.
 On November 1, 2013, The Double Q switched to an all Christmas format branding themselves as "Christmas 94.7".  The Facebook site was taken down and the website was revamped, with a link to a YouTube video "Retooning the Holidays".  A video was posted on Facebook by DJ Chris Cash signing the Double Q off the air for the final time.
 On November 28, 2013, an advertising agency rep announced that the new format would be an Adult Contemporary station.
 On January 1, 2014, WQQR launched its new adult contemporary format, branded as "94.7 The Mix".

Current line-up
As of May 2015 the on-air line-up for WZYK is as follows:

Weekdays
 Mark & Stacy in the morning 6a-10a
 Brian Mitchell 3p-7p

Weekends
 There is a rotating live air staff on hand Saturdays from 10a-3p, as the rest of the weekend is filled with syndicated programming such as Retro Pop Reunion, American Top 40 both '70s and '80s versions, Scott Shannon with America's Greatest Hits, and multiple versions of Rick Dees Weekly Top 40.

Previous logo

References

External links

ZYK
Hickman County, Kentucky
Mainstream adult contemporary radio stations in the United States
1955 establishments in Kentucky
Radio stations established in 1955